Antagony is an American deathcore/metalcore band from the Bay Area of California, United States, formed in 1998, disbanded in 2009, and reformed in 2019. The group are noted for combining their metalcore style with a remarkable amount of death metal influence, which has led to the group to being considered one the pioneers of the deathcore genre. Antagony has released three albums, each on a different record label. Members of Antagony have gone on to form bands such as Oblivion, All Shall Perish.

History
Antagony formed in 1998 by former members of the metalcore band Y.F.H. Founding members Nick Vasallo, Carlos Saldana, Ben Orum, and Jody Handy combined elements from disparate forms of extreme music: grindcore, hardcore, death metal, tribal drumming and doom into one sonic experience. They showcased their eclectic mix of styles in their first release, an EP entitled Expect the Worst, and followed it with their first US tour. With a new drummer (Justin Hughes), their first album, See Through These Eyes, released in 2001, further refined their style. Soon after, Antagony became one of the premier extreme metal groups in the Bay Area underground performing with such acts as Malevolent Creation, Incantation, Excruciating Terror, Pig Destroyer, Grimple, Dystopia, Capitalist Casualties, Cephalic Carnage, Brujeria, Vital Remains, Cattle Decapitation, Intronaut, Disgorge, Exhumed, Obituary, As I Lay Dying, and Monstrosity.

After their Triangle of Hate Tour U.S.A. 2001, with supporting acts End of All and Boof, Antagony fell into a period of inactivity with all of their members directing their energies into other projects.

By the time Antagony resurfaced with a new lineup (Kyle Anderson, Christian Mitchell, and Carlos Saldana replacing Ben Orum, Bray Almini, and Caysen Russo), Antagony strived to catch up on time away from the evolving metal scene. Antagony finally released the long-awaited Rebirth in 2005, combining material they had written since 2001. Although well received by fans and critics, it was a record that should have been released two years before.

With their next album, Days of Night, Antagony wished to shed their previous attempt at appeasing the audience. This was to be their most eclectic recording to date. The album employed use of cellos, broken pianos, choirs, different simultaneous metronome markings, and several layers of overdubbing. Musically, this album was a lot more "classically" structured as well; previously Antagony depended on the use of constant sectional changes to catch listeners off guard. This proved especially effective when performing live and this variation form they put into their early sound definitely influenced their peers. Justin parted ways with Antagony during the recording of the album, but performs on three of the tracks ("The Truth Will Be Known", "Exhale Her Poison", and "Voyage").

Antagony parted ways in 2009 after 10 years of existence. Founding members Nick Vasallo and Ben Orum joined forces again to form the death metal band Oblivion.

Band members
Current lineup
Nick Vasallo - guitar (1998-2007, 2019-) bass (2008-2009) vocals (1998-2009, 2019-)
Ben Orum - guitar (1998-2004, 2019-) vocals (1998-2003)
Carlos Saldana - bass guitar (1998-2001) vocals (2004-2009, 2019-)
Bray Almini - bass (2002-2004, 2019-)
Luis Martinez - drums (2008-2009, 2019-)
Former members
Jody Handy - drums (1998-2000; died 2009)
Justin Hughes - drums (2000-2007)
Cayson Russo - vocals (2003)
Christian Mitchell - bass (2004-2008)
Phil Cancilla - drums (2007)
Brian Camera - drums (2007-2008)
Kyle Anderson - guitar (2004-2009)
Ryan Rey - guitar (2006-2009)

Timeline

Discography
Studio albums

Music videos

References

External links
 Myspace entry

Death metal musical groups from California
American deathcore musical groups
Metalcore musical groups from California
American grindcore musical groups
Hardcore punk groups from California
Musical groups from Oakland, California
Musical groups established in 1999
Musical groups disestablished in 2009
1999 establishments in California